Bir-Hakeim is an elevated station of the Paris Métro serving line 6 in the Boulevard de Grenelle in the 15th arrondissement. It is situated on the left bank of the Bir-Hakeim bridge over the Seine. The name of both the bridge and the station commemorates the World War II battle of Bir Hakeim.

The station is above the RER C line; the station Champ de Mars - Tour Eiffel is within walking distance.

History

The station opened as part of the former Line 2 South on 24 April 1906, when it was extended from Passy to Place d'Italie. On 14 October 1907 Line 2 South was incorporated into Line 5. It was incorporated into line 6 on 12 October 1942. The station was called Quai de Grenelle until 1949, when it was renamed to commemorate the battle of Bir Hakeim. A commemorative panel is situated at the entrance of the platform for trains traveling towards Nation. The station was the location of the Barrière de la Cunette, a gate built for the collection of taxation as part of the Wall of the Farmers-General; the gate was built between 1784 and 1788 and demolished in the nineteenth century.

Places of interest
It is the station closest to the Eiffel Tower; the signs on the station walls say "Bir-Hakeim — Tour Eiffel".

Near the station is the site of the former Vélodrome d'hiver (Winter Velodrome or "Vel' d'Hiv"), which was famous for its cycling competitions but became infamous as the first place of detention for thousands of Parisian Jews who were rounded up by the police on 16 and 17 July 1942 before their deportation to Nazi concentration camps. The velodrome was destroyed in 1960 in the course of work done on the bank of the Seine (Front de Seine). A commemorative monument has been raised near the south side of the station, above the tracks of the RER C.

In the film Last Tango in Paris, Maria Schneider's character has an argument which leads to a physical altercation with her boyfriend in the Bir-Hakeim station.

Station layout

Gallery

Notes

References
Roland, Gérard (2003). Stations de métro. D’Abbesses à Wagram. Éditions Bonneton.

Paris Métro stations in the 15th arrondissement of Paris
Railway stations in France opened in 1906